Louis Westerfield (born 1949 in DeKalb, Mississippi – August 24, 1996) was a lawyer, law professor, and the first African-American Dean of the University of Mississippi School of Law.

Early years
Westerfield was the son of a Mississippi sharecropper. He received his bachelor's degree from Southern University at New Orleans in 1971. In 1974, he received his Juris Doctor from Loyola University School of Law in New Orleans. He earned his Master of Laws from Columbia Law School in New York City in 1980.

Westerfield began his legal career in 1974 as an assistant district attorney in New Orleans and a year later became assistant professor of law and director of the law clinic at Southern University Law Center. Westerfield joined Loyola's law faculty in 1978 and went to the University of Mississippi as its first tenured black law professor in 1983. He became dean of the University of Mississippi School of Law in 1994.

On August 24, 1996, Westerfield died unexpectedly due to a massive heart attack.

Notes and references 

1946 births
1996 deaths
Columbia Law School alumni
African-American lawyers
20th-century American lawyers
Activists for African-American civil rights
Southern University at New Orleans alumni
People from De Kalb, Mississippi
20th-century African-American people